The Edinburgh Dental Institute is a teaching body based in the Lauriston Building in Lauriston Place, Edinburgh. It is part of the University of Edinburgh.

History
The facility was formed as the Edinburgh Dental Dispensary in 1860. It moved to a purpose-built building in Chambers Street as the Edinburgh Dental Hospital and School in 1927 and then joined the National Health Service in 1948. The organisation moved to the Lauriston Building in 1997 and was renamed the Edinburgh Dental Institute in 1999.

References

NHS Scotland hospitals
Teaching hospitals in Scotland
Hospitals in Edinburgh
NHS Lothian